FK Daşqın Zaqatala was an Azerbaijani football club from Zaqatala founded in 1968, and dissolved in 1993.

They participated in the Azerbaijan Top Division twice, 1992 and 1993, finishing 17th and then 6th. Gurban Gurbanov was the club's top goalscorer during this period with 24 goals, but the club folded at the end of the '93 season due to financial difficulties. Daşqın Zaqatala was reformed a year later and took part in the 1994–95 Azerbaijan First Division, however the club again ceased to operate at the end of that season.

League and domestic cup history

References

External links 
 Daşqın Zaqatala on national-football-teams.com

Dasqin Zaqatala
Association football clubs established in 1968
Defunct football clubs in Azerbaijan
Association football clubs disestablished in 1995